Swarkestone is a civil parish in the South Derbyshire district of Derbyshire, England.  The parish contains 19 listed buildings that are recorded in the National Heritage List for England. Of these, one is listed at Grade I, the highest of the three grades, three are at Grade II*, the middle grade, and the others are at Grade II, the lowest grade.  The parish contains the village of Swarkestone and the surrounding area.  The Trent and Mersey Canal passes through the northern part of the parish, and the listed buildings associated with it are bridges, a lock, mileposts, and a former toll house with an outbuilding.  The other listed buildings include houses and associated structures, farmhouses and farm buildings, a church and a cross in the churchyard, a public house and its former stable block, and former reading rooms.


Key

Buildings

References

Citations

Sources

 

Lists of listed buildings in Derbyshire